Wachamakulit: 'Wag Matakot, Makibata! is a 2010 Philippine television game show broadcast by GMA Network. Hosted by Eugene Domingo, it premiered on April 16, 2010. The show concluded on September 24, 2010 with a total of 24 episodes.

Hosts

 Eugene Domingo
 Jillian Ward

Ratings
According to AGB Nielsen Philippines' Mega Manila household television ratings, the pilot episode of Wachamakulit earned a 5.2% rating. While the final episode scored a 2.8% rating in Mega Manila People/Individual television ratings.

References

2010 Philippine television series debuts
2010 Philippine television series endings
Filipino-language television shows
GMA Network original programming
Philippine game shows